The Xi'an Olympic Sports Center is a sports complex with a multi-purpose stadium, a gymnasium and an aquatics center in Xi'an, Shaanxi Province, China.

The building opened in October 2020. The Xi'an Olympic Sports Center was the venue for the athletics and aquatics competitions of the 2021 National Games of China, as well as the opening and closing ceremonies.

References

Multi-purpose stadiums in China
Sports venues in Shaanxi